Highway 27, the Stuart Lake Highway, is a 53 km (33 mi) long spur of the Yellowhead Highway in the Regional District of Bulkley-Nechako. First opened in 1967, it provides a connection from Vanderhoof, on Highway 16, north to Fort St. James, at the southern end of Stuart Lake. Highway 27 is a two lane roadway maintained year round by third party contractors overseen by the British Columbia Ministry of Transportation and Infrastructure. Wildlife such as moose and deer pose a frequent hazard to motorists along the route.

027